Saburo's Sushi House Restaurant, or simply Saburo's, is a sushi restaurant in Portland, Oregon.

Description and reception

The 2010 guide Best Places: Portland says, "come here for no-frills, value sushi". In her book Food Lover's Guide to Portland, Liz Crain said Saburo's serves "big-ass" sushi. Portland Monthly says, "Rolls the size of Hondas will have you coming back to this popular Sellwood sushi joint. The albacore tuna, softshell crab, and sea urchin topped with quail egg yolk swim to the top of the list." In her Insiders' Guide to Portland, Oregon, Rachel Dresbeck wrote: 

In 2016, Saburo's ranked third in the Best Sushi category of Willamette Week annual reader's poll. Michael Russell ranked Saburo's number 9 in The Oregonian 2018 list of Portland's top ten sushi restaurants, writing: "The raw fish might not be quite at the level as some of the restaurants later on this list, but the Japanese lagers are cold, the nigiri are as big as your fist and the vibe is great at this popular Sellwood sushi spot." Alex Frane included Saburo's in Eater Portland 2019 overview of "Where to Imbibe and Dine in Sellwood and Westmoreland".

See also
 List of Japanese restaurants
 List of sushi restaurants

References

External links

 
 
 Saburo's Sushi House at Zomato

Japanese restaurants in Portland, Oregon
Sellwood-Moreland, Portland, Oregon
Sushi restaurants in the United States
Seafood restaurants in Portland, Oregon